Josef Anton or Joseph-Antoine Froelicher or Frölicher (2 November 1790 - 9 January 1866, Paris) was a Swiss architect.

Coming from an old  middle-class family from Solothurn, Froelicher begins his architectural  studies in Switzerland, receiving his degree in Solothurn in 1809.  He then left for Paris, endowed with a pension from the Swiss government to complete his studies in Paris.  He entered the école des Beaux-Arts in 1809, gallicizing his name into Joseph Antoine Frelicher, then Froelicher.

Architect to many families of the high French aristocracy, he built many châteaux and hôtels particuliers.  A Legitimist monarchist, he became the official architect to the duchess of Berry, which brought him much ill-feeling at the time of the July Revolution.  He was made a naturalised Frenchman in 1821, and his daughter married the architect Henri Parent.

1790 births
1866 deaths
19th-century Swiss architects
19th-century French architects